Addison is a town in Washington County, Maine, United States. The town was named after English author Joseph Addison. The population was 1,148 as of the 2020 census.

Geography

Demographics

2010 census

As of the census of 2010, there were 1,266 people, 529 households, and 359 families residing in the town. The racial makeup of the town was 96.4% White, 0.5% African American, 1.7% Native American, 0.6% Asian, 0.1% from other races, and 0.7% from two or more races. Hispanic or Latino of any race were 0.7% of the population.

There were 529 households, of which 28.5% had children under the age of 18 living with them, 56.0% were married couples living together, 7.2% had a female householder with no husband present, 4.7% had a male householder with no wife present, and 32.1% were non-families. 22.7% of all households were made up of individuals, and 9.6% had someone living alone who was 65 years of age or older. The average household size was 2.37 and the average family size was 2.77.

The median age in the town was 45.1 years. 20.5% of residents were under the age of 18; 5.5% were between the ages of 18 and 24; 23.8% were from 25 to 44; 30.9% were from 45 to 64; and 19.3% were 65 years of age or older. The gender makeup of the town was 49.4% male and 50.6% female.

2000 census

As of the census of 2000, there were 1,209 people, 489 households, and 341 families with a population density of 28.5 people per square mile (11.0/km), and 723 housing units at an average density of 17.1 per square mile (6.6/km).  The racial makeup of the town was 98.10% White, 0.58% African American, 0.25% Native American, 0.25% Asian, 0.08% Pacific Islander, 0.08% from other races, and 0.66% from two or more races. Hispanic or Latino of any race were 0.17% of the population.

There were 489 households, out of which 31.1% of which had children under the age of 18 living in them, 59.5% were married couples living together, 6.1% had a female householder with no husband present, and 30.1% were non-families. 21.1% of all households were made up of individuals, and 9.2% had someone living alone who was 65 years of age or older.  The average household size was 2.45 and the average family size was 2.83.

In the town, the population was spread, with 23.5% under the age of 18, 6.1% from 18 to 24, 26.8% from 25 to 44, 29.5% from 45 to 64, and 14.1% were 65 years of age or older.  The median age was 40 years.  For every 100 females, there were 96.9 males.  For every 100 females age 18 and over, there were 96.4 males.

The median income for a household in the town was $26,083, and the median income for a family was $30,000. Males had a median income of $22,432 versus $18,194 for females. The per capita income for the town was $15,951.  About 14.7% of families and 20.4% of the population were below the poverty line, including 27.9% of those under age 18 and 16.6% of those age 65 or over.

Recreation

Recreational opportunities include walking trails, beaches, islands, and parks.

Cemeteries

 Addison Point and West Side
 Church Hill Cemetery
 Nash Cemetery at Addison Point on West Branch Stream
 Dyer Cemetery on the llama farm property
 Cemetery on Nat Lord property, (in Harrington)
 Ramsdell's Cove Cemetery, (in Harrington)
 Wescogus
 Wescogus Cemetery on Tracy corner
 Norton Cemetery, on the road to Wescogus
 Merritt Cemetery, behind the gravel pit on Route 187
 Marshall/Sawyer Cemetery in John Foss field
 Indian River. Basin and along the south part of Route 187
 Indian River Cemetery, (in Jonesport)
 Leighton Cemetery at Hall's Hill
 Zebediah Alley family, on Crowley Island
 Crowley's Island Cemetery
 William Gray family Cemetery on Basin Road
 Hiram Tabbutt family Cemetery
 Carver Cemetery on the Lang's Quarry Road
 Basin Cemetery
 Cemetery near Margaret Stevens (none found)
 Batson Cemetery, near Ronnie Look
 Newberry Cemetery near, Austin Lamson
 Kelley Cemetery near the shore
 Chandler Cemetery on Bickford Point
 Joyville Cemetery
 Doyle Island
 East Side
 Norton Family Cemetery, behind Carlton Norton's
 Look Family Cemetery, north of Walter Batson's
 Look Cemetery
Sheila L. Batson Cemetery
 Eastside Cemetery
 Graves at Three Brooks (none found)
 Look Graves behind Preble house
 Foster, Hinkley, Irons & Norton graves, near Stoddard House
 Look and Redimarker, behind Shirley Redimarker's
 Farnsworth graves in Walter Batson's pasture
 South Addison and Cape Split
 South Addison Cemetery
 Cape Split Cemetery
 Ladd-Look Family Cemetery
 Wass Cemetery near Miranda Thompson house
 Harry and Vesta Wass Cemetery
 Tabbutt Cemetery, across from Lea Reiber field
 Christopher Wass Cemetery

Notable people

 Henry Plummer (1832–1864), sheriff and outlaw leader of The Innocents, in Bannock, Montana, Idaho Territory

References

External links

Towns in Washington County, Maine
Towns in Maine
Populated coastal places in Maine
1779 establishments in Massachusetts